Bishops Corner is an unincorporated community in Kent County, Delaware, United States. Bishops Corner is located at the intersection of U.S. Route 13 and Delaware Route 42, east of Cheswold.

References

External links

Unincorporated communities in Kent County, Delaware
Unincorporated communities in Delaware